Aino Kalda (19 August 1929 Tallinn – 7 March 2017) was an Estonian botanist (including bryologist).

In 1953 she graduated from Tartu State University. 1959-1973 she worked at Tartu University's plant systematics and geobotany department. 1973-1996 she worked at Estonian Institute of Forestry.

Awards
 1982: Estonian SSR State Prize

Works

 Botaanika I (1965, one of the authors)
 Botaanika II (1970, one of the authors)
 Välibotaanika (1970)
 Lahemaa rahvuspargi taimkate ja selle geobotaaniline liigestus. – Lahemaa uurimused 1988, III
 Koosluste kaitse ja kaitsealad. – Taimeriigi kaitsest Eesti NSV-s (1988)
 Eesti sammalde määraja (1998, one of the authors)

References

1929 births
2017 deaths
20th-century Estonian botanists
Bryologists
University of Tartu alumni
Scientists from Tallinn